Revenge is a 1990 American romantic action thriller film directed by Tony Scott and starring Kevin Costner, Anthony Quinn, Madeleine Stowe, Miguel Ferrer and Sally Kirkland. Some scenes were filmed in Mexico. The film is a production of New World Pictures and Rastar Films and was released by Columbia Pictures. Revenge also features one of John Leguizamo's earliest film roles.  The film is based on a novella written by Jim Harrison, published in Esquire magazine in 1979.  Harrison co-wrote the script for the film.

Plot
Michael J. "Jay" Cochran (Kevin Costner) is a U.S. Navy aviator, leaving the service after 12 years. He receives a matched pair of Beretta shotguns and an invitation from his wealthy friend, Tiburon "Tibey" Mendez (Anthony Quinn) to spend time at his hacienda in Mexico. Tibey is also a powerful crime boss, constantly surrounded by bodyguards.

In Mexico, Cochran meets Tibey's beautiful young wife, Miryea (Madeleine Stowe) who lives in lavish surroundings, but is unhappy because her much-older husband does not want children, feeling pregnancy would spoil her looks.

Jay presents Tibey with a Navy G-1 leather flight jacket. But he rubs Tibey's suspicious right-hand man, Cesar (Tomas Milian) the wrong way by behaving independently and not acting like an employee. After a dinner Tibey conducts a private meeting with business associates, killing one of them, while elsewhere Miryea and Jay get better acquainted, developing a romantic attraction for each other.

During a party, with Tibey and his men nearby, Jay and Miryea secretly have sex in a closet. Jay tells her he intends to leave Mexico, worried that Tibey will become aware of the situation. Miryea begs him to stay and having fallen in love with her, he agrees and together, they arrange a secret rendezvous at a remote cabin in Mexico.

Miryea tells Tibey that she will be visiting her sister in Miami, but Tibey overhears a telephone conversation in which Miryea asks her sister to lie for her. Tibey drives Miryea to the airport, giving her one last kiss. Jay is secretly waiting inside the airport and they drive off to the cabin.

At their hideaway, they are surprised by Tibey and his men. Jay's beloved dog Rocky is shot dead. Calling Miryea a "faithless whore", Tibey strikes her and cuts her across the mouth with a knife (creating half a Glasgow smile) as Tibey's henchmen viciously beat Jay bloody. After setting fire to the cabin, they dump Jay in the desert, leaving him to die.

Miryea is placed in a whorehouse with Tibby giving instructions for her to be “fucked 50 times a day”, where she is drugged, abused and relegated to "common use". The young man responsible for keeping her drugged has AIDS. As Miryea no longer wishes to live, she persuades him to share a needle with her, thus infecting her.

An unconscious Jay is discovered by Mauro (Joaquín Martínez) a peasant farmer whose family slowly nurses Jay back to health. Jay returns to the burnt cabin and retrieves some money he had hidden. Mauro drives Jay to town and gives him a knife to "cut the balls off your enemy". Jay encounters a sickly Texan (James Gammon) transporting a horse, who offers Jay a ride to Durango. Inside a cantina, Jay notices one of the thugs who had thrashed him; he follows him into the men's room and cuts his throat.

After a day on the road, the Texan delivers the horse to a wealthy man, who recognizes Jay from an afternoon at Tibey's estate. The friendly Texan later dies peacefully in his car, while Jay is driving.

At a motel, Jay runs across Amador (Miguel Ferrer), Mauro's brother-in-law. Amador and his quiet friend, Ignacio (John Leguizamo) are willing to help Jay because Amador's sister was killed after getting mixed up in business that involved Tibey. They capture another of Tibey's henchmen, who tells them where Miryea can be found. Jay barges into the brothel, only to find that she has been moved. The madam taunts Jay that Miryea proved very popular with the clientele. No one but Tibey knows where she is.

Jay, Amador and Ignacio ambush Tibey and his bodyguard during Tibey's morning horseback ride. Jay is there to ask Miryea's whereabouts, but first Tibey requests that Jay ask forgiveness for having stolen his wife. When Jay lowers his gun and asks Tibey's forgiveness, Tibey reveals that Miryea is in a convent.

Miryea is in a convent hospice, dying of AIDS. Jay arrives in time to tell Miryea that he loves her. He carries her outside and Miryea tells Jay that she also loves him before she dies in his arms.

Cast

Production

Development
The novella was published in 1979 along with two other novellas under the title Legends of the Fall. Esquire magazine published the novella Legends of the Fall in January 1979 and public response was so enthusiastic that Revenge was published in May. Warner Bros promptly bought the screen rights and hired Harrison to do the screenplay.

The project languished in development hell for eleven years. John Huston was to direct Jack Nicholson and then Orson Welles was attached to direct. Harrison later recalled he "wrote about 12 different endings to it". Walter Hill worked on the screenplay for a while.

Costner had an interest in the novella from the mid-1980s. "It seemed to me something I wanted to do myself", he said. "I contemplated directing it because it seemed like a small movie. The story was manageable, but the themes were big and universal, and the writing was tough and it was honest and it was original. There was poignance in the story, and it read like an original movie to me."

Producer Ray Stark eventually acquired the rights from Warner Bros in exchange for the film Bird. Costner used his celebrity status to help get the film made.

Costner would serve as executive producer and take a special interest in the script. The writer was Robert Garland who made No Way Out with Costner.

For a time it seemed John Huston might direct Costner in the film and the two men met; Huston was not impressed by the actor. In 1987, New World Pictures teamed up with Rastar to co-own feature film rights to the Revenge project.

Shooting
Principal shooting took place in several Mexican cities, including Puerto Vallarta and Mexico City.  Production completed on December 14, 1988.  Some shooting took place in Sierra de Órganos National Park in the town of Sombrerete, Mexico. The closing scene was shot at the Iglesia de Nuestra Señora de los Remedios, one of several monasteries near the volcano Popocatapetl.   Director Tony Scott would lend several assets from his prior making of Top Gun, including access to the Navy personnel to arrange footage of F-14s over rough desert terrain. Viewers would also recognize the familiar cockpit simulators in Revenge's opening sequence as those used in Top Gun.

Release 
Columbia released Revenge on VHS and Betamax in August 1990.  The version included on the 2007 DVD and Blu-ray releases is Tony Scott's director's cut, shorter by 20 minutes, running 104 minutes, and including expanded scenes as well as some deletions and additional scoring by Harry Gregson-Williams.

Reception 
On Rotten Tomatoes the film has an approval rating of 32% based on reviews from 19 critics, with an average rating of 4.4/10. On Metacritic it has a score of 35 out of 100 based on reviews from 23 critics, indicating "generally unfavorable reviews". Audiences surveyed by CinemaScore gave the film a grade B− on scale of A to F.

Variety wrote, "This far-from-perfect rendering of Jim Harrison's shimmering novella has a romantic sweep and elemental power that ultimately transcend its flaws."  Owen Gleiberman of Entertainment Weekly rated it D and called it a vanity project for Costner.  Roger Ebert, writing for The Chicago Sun-Times, rated it 2.5 out of 4 stars and wrote that the film "plays like a showdown between its style and its story."  Vincent Canby of The New York Times described it as "soft and aimless ... the performances are without conviction."  Hal Hinson of The Washington Post wrote that the story becomes so cynical that nothing has meaning.

"They pretty much shot the novella", said Harrison. "I was so swept away by it that I cried – I really did. And I'm not known for crying".

References

External links 
 
 

1990 films
1990s romantic thriller films
American crime thriller films
American romantic drama films
American crime drama films
Films scored by Jack Nitzsche
American films about revenge
Films set in Mexico
Columbia Pictures films
New World Pictures films
Films directed by Tony Scott
American romantic thriller films
1990s English-language films
1990s American films